Zelenyi Hai is a village in Dubno Raion, Lviv Oblast, Ukraine. 

Villages in Dubno Raion